Maribo Bryghus was a Danish brewery located in the town of Maribo. The brewery was founded in 1895 by Christian Jørgensen as Thor Brewery (Thor Bryggeri). It was renamed ten years later to avoid confusion with the Thor Brewery in Randers. In 1997 Maribo Bryghus was acquired by Albani Brewery, which later merged with Bryggerigruppen, now Royal Unibrew.

In 2007 it was decided to close the brewery in the first quarter of 2008. One of the reasons was the increase of the water price in Maribo. Maribo Bryghus was the discount brewery of Royal Unibrew. Production of the most famous Maribo beer brands has been moved to the Faxe Bryggeri in Faxe.

The Egmont Dormitory in Copenhagen is known for its consumption of Maribo Pilsner. 

Royal Unibrew subsidiaries

External links
Official Royal Unibrew Site

 

Breweries in Denmark
Companies based in Lolland Municipality
Danish companies established in 1895
Maribo